Parliamentary elections were held in Zaire on 18 and 19 September 1982. The Popular Movement of the Revolution was the only legal party at the time, and all candidates who stood for election to the Legislative Council had to be members of it. In total, 1,409 candidates ran for the 310 seats (increased from 252 due to population growth) in 154 constituencies.

Results

References

Elections in the Democratic Republic of the Congo
1982 in Zaire
One-party elections
Zaire
Election and referendum articles with incomplete results
September 1982 events in Africa